The South West Pacific theatre, during World War II, was a major theatre of the war between the Allies and the Axis. It included the Philippines, the Dutch East Indies (except for Sumatra), Borneo, Australia and its mandate Territory of New Guinea (including the Bismarck Archipelago) and the western part of the Solomon Islands. This area was defined by the Allied powers' South West Pacific Area (SWPA) command.

In the South West Pacific theatre, Japanese forces fought primarily against the forces of the United States and Australia. New Zealand, the Netherlands (mainly the Dutch East Indies), the Philippines, United Kingdom, and other Allied nations also contributed forces.

The South Pacific became a major theatre of the war following the Japanese attack on Pearl Harbor in December 1941. Initially, US war plans called for a counteroffensive across the Central Pacific, but this was disrupted by the loss of battleships at Pearl Harbor. During the First South Pacific Campaign, US forces sought to establish a defensive perimeter against additional Japanese attacks. This was followed by the Second South Pacific Campaign, which began with the Battle of Guadalcanal.

Allied command

The U.S. General Douglas MacArthur had been in command of the American forces in the Philippines in what was to become the South West Pacific theatre, but was then part of a larger theatre that encompassed the South West Pacific, the Southeast Asian mainland (including Indochina and Malaya) and the North of Australia, under the short lived American-British-Dutch-Australian Command (ABDACOM). Shortly after the collapse of ABDACOM, supreme command of the South West Pacific theatre passed to MacArthur who was appointed Supreme Commander, South West Pacific Area on 30 March 1942. However, MacArthur preferred to use the title "Commander-in-Chief." The other major theatre in the Pacific, Pacific Ocean Areas, was commanded by U.S. Admiral Chester Nimitz, who was also Commander-in-Chief Pacific Fleet. Both MacArthur and Nimitz were overseen by the US Joint Chiefs and the British-U.S. Combined Chiefs of Staff. Captain Allan Rockwell McCann was appointed to represent the Navy as the Senior Representative of Commander, Submarines, Southwest Pacific, to General MacArthur.

Japanese command

The Nanpo gun was responsible for Imperial Japanese Army (IJA) ground and air units in Southeast Asia and the South Pacific. The  of the Imperial Japanese Navy (IJN) was responsible for all Japanese warships, naval aviation units and marine infantry units. As the Japanese military did not formally utilize joint/combined staff at the operational level, the command structures/geographical areas of operations of the Nanpo gun and Rengō Kantai overlapped each other and those of the Allies.

Major campaigns
 Battle of the Philippines (1941–1942)
 Battle of Bataan
 Battle of Corregidor
 Dutch East Indies campaign, 1941–1942
 Battle of Badung Strait, 19–20 February 1942
 Battle of the Java Sea, 27 February 1942
 Battle of Sunda Strait, 28 February – 1 March 1942
 Second Battle of the Java Sea, 1 March 1942
 Solomon Islands campaign, 1943–1945
 New Georgia Campaign, June–August 1943
 Battle of Kula Gulf, 6 July 1943
 Battle of Kolombangara, 13 July 1943
 Battle of Vella Gulf, 6–7 August 1943
 Naval Battle of Vella Lavella, 6–7 October 1943
 Battle of the Treasury Islands, 27 October-12 November 1943
 Battle of Empress Augusta Bay, 2 November 1943
 Battle of Cape St. George, 25 November 1943
 Bougainville Campaign, November 1943 – August 1945
 New Guinea campaign, 1942–1945
 Battle of Rabaul, January–February 1942
 Invasion of Salamaua–Lae, March 1942
 Battle of the Coral Sea, 4–8 May 1942
 Invasion of Buna-Gona, July 1942
 Kokoda Track campaign, July–November 1942
 Battle of Milne Bay, August–September 1942
 Battle of Goodenough Island, October 1942
 Battle of Buna-Gona, November 1942 – January 1943
 Battle of Wau, January 1943
 Battle of the Bismarck Sea, 2 March 1943
 Operation Chronicle, 1943
 Landing at Nassau Bay, 1943
 Salamaua-Lae campaign, April–September 1943
 Finisterre Range campaign, September 1943 – April 1944
 Huon Peninsula campaign, September 1943 – March 1944
 New Britain campaign, 26 December 1943
 Admiralty Islands campaign, 29 February 1944
 Invasion of Hollandia and landing at Aitape, 22 April 1944
 Battle of Biak, 27 May 1944
 Battle of Noemfoor, 2 July 1944
 Battle of Morotai, 15 September 1944
 Aitape-Wewak campaign, November 1944
 Battle of Timor, 1942–1943
 Philippines campaign (1944–1945)
 Battle of Leyte, October–December 1944
 Battle of Leyte Gulf, 23–26 October 1944
 Battle of Mindoro, December 1944
 Battle of Lingayen Gulf, January 1945
 Battle of Luzon, January–August 1945
 Battle of Manila, February–March 1945
 Battle of Corregidor, February 1945
 Invasion of Palawan, February–April 1945
 Battle of the Visayas, March–July 1945
 Battle of Mindanao, March–August 1945
 Battle of Maguindanao, January–September 1945
 Borneo campaign, 1945
 Battle of Tarakan, May–June 1945
 Battle of North Borneo, June–August 1945
 Battle of Balikpapan, July 1945

See also
 American-British-Dutch-Australian Command

Notes

References

Further reading
 
 
 
 
 - Translation of the official record by the Japanese Demobilization Bureaux detailing the Imperial Japanese Army and Navy's participation in the Southwest Pacific area of the Pacific War.

 

Theaters and campaigns of World War II
Military history of Australia during World War II
Military history of New Zealand during World War II
Military history of the Philippines during World War II